Gasolin' was a Danish rock band.

Gasolin' may also refer to:

Gasolin' (album), the first album by Gasolin'
Gasolin' (1974 album), the first English-language album by Gasolin'
Gasolin' (film), a documentary about Gasolin'

See also
Gasoline (disambiguation)